The following is a timeline of the history of the city of Huntsville, Alabama, USA.

Prior to 20th century

 1809 - Town of Twickenham incorporated in U.S. Mississippi Territory.
 1811 - Twickenham renamed "Huntsville".
 1812 - Green Academy established.
 1817
 Town becomes part of U.S. Alabama Territory.
 Huntsville Republican newspaper in publication.
 1818 - Huntsville social library active.
 1819
 Alabama Territory constitutional convention held in Huntsville.
 Town becomes part of new U.S. state of Alabama.
 Newly formed Alabama Legislature convenes in Huntsville.
 1820 - Alabama state capital relocated from Huntsville to Cahaba.
 1822 - Maple Hill Cemetery in use (approximate date).
 1825 - Southern Advocate and Huntsville Advertiser newspaper in publication.
 1835 - A large fire near the Courthouse Square destroys about a dozen buildings.
 1840 - Population: 2,496.
 1844 - Huntsville was chartered as a city.
 1855 - Memphis and Charleston Railroad begins operating.
 1860 - Huntsville Depot built.
 1862 - Huntsville occupied by Union forces during the American Civil War.
 1870 - Population: 4,907.
 1888 - Old Federal Square U.S. Post Office and Courts built on corner of Randolph St and Green St
 1888 - Monte Sano Railroad Workers' House built.
 1896 - Oakwood College founded.
 1898 - B’nai Israel Synagogue built.
 1900 - Population: 8,068.

20th century
 1904 - An angry mob sets fire to the city jail during the lead up to the Lynching of Horace Maples.
 1910 - Huntsville Daily Times newspaper begins publication.
 1912 - Lyric Theatre in business.
 1916 - Carnegie Public Library building opens.
 1932 - United States Courthouse and Post Office built.
 1935 - Monte Sano State Park established near city.
 1937 - WBHP radio begins broadcasting.
 1938 - Wheeler National Wildlife Refuge established in vicinity of Huntsville.
 1941 - U.S. military Redstone Arsenal begins operating.
 1943 - (August) Community Chest, later to becomeUnited Way of Madison County, founded by community leaders
1947 - Keller (automobile) production begins.
 1950
 Area of city: 4 square miles.
 Population: 16,437.
 1951 - Huntsville-Madison County Historical Society formed.
 1955
 Huntsville Symphony Orchestra formed.
 Memorial Parkway is constructed as a bypass around downtown.
 1957 - Lee High School built.
 1959 - WAFG-TV (television) begins broadcasting.
 1960
 U.S. NASA Marshall Space Flight Center established.
 Area of city: 51 square miles.
 Population: 72,365.
 1962 - Arts Council formed.
 1964 - Huntsville News begins publication. 
 1968 - Joe W. Davis becomes mayor.
 1969 - Virgil I. Grissom High School established.
 1970 - Population: 139,282.
 1974 - Oakwood Adventist Academy established.
 1975
 Von Braun Civic Center (convention centre) opens.
 Madison County Nature Trail established.
 1976 - Huntsville Depot museum established.
 1982
 Panoply Arts Festival begins.
 Alabama Constitution Village museum established.
 1984 - Madison Square Mall in business.
 1986 - Interstate 565 highway construction starts.
 1988 - Steve Hettinger becomes mayor.
 1989 - November 1989 tornado outbreak.
 1990 - Population: 159,880.
 1993 - Big Spring Jam (music festival) begins.
 1995 - May 18: Anderson Hills tornado.
 1996
 Loretta Spencer becomes mayor.
 Huntsville News ceases publication.
 1997 - United States Army Aviation and Missile Command headquartered in Huntsville.

21st century

 2006 - November 20: 2006 Huntsville bus crash.
 2008 - Tommy Battle becomes mayor.
 2010
 February 12: University of Alabama in Huntsville shooting.
 Population: 180,105.
 2014
 Area of city: 210 square miles.
 Twickenham Square shopping/residential complex built.
 Restore our Roads initiative created to fund a large amount of infrastructure projects to handle projected growth.
 2018 - A Huntsville police officer, William Darby, shoots and kills a suicidal man seconds after arriving at the scene. The city council votes to pay the officer's legal defense. Cleared of wrong-doing by the police review board, Darby is convicted of murder. The mayor and police chief continued to support the officer after the guilt verdict.
 2020
 Construction begins on the next segment of the Northern Bypass, connecting Interstate 565 to US 231/431.
 A George Floyd protest on June 3, 2020, was ended by Huntsville Police along with SWAT and Incident Response Team using tear gas, pepper spray, and rubber bullets.

See also
 Huntsville, Alabama history
 List of mayors of Huntsville, Alabama
 National Register of Historic Places listings in Huntsville, Alabama
 Timelines of other cities in Alabama: Birmingham, Mobile, Montgomery, Tuscaloosa

References

Bibliography

 
 
 
 
 
 
 
 
  1971-
 
 
 
 
 
 
 
  2011- (Local wiki)
 
 . (City plan)

External links

 
 Items related to Huntsville, various dates (via Digital Public Library of America)
 
  (Annotated list of links)
  (Materials related to Huntsville, Ala.)
 
 

 
Huntsville
Years in Alabama